Cypress Lake or Cypress Lakes refers to several locations in North America:

Lakes
 Cypress Lake (Lafayette, Louisiana)
 Cypress Lake (Saskatchewan), a lake is Saskatchewan, Canada
 Cypress Lake, a lake in Hempstead County, Arkansas
 Cypress Lake, a lake in Miller County, Arkansas
 Cypress Lake, a lake in White County, Arkansas

Other uses
 Cypress Lake, Florida, a census-designated place
 Cypress Lake High School, Florida
 Cypress Lake Preserve, Ridge Manor, Florida
 Cypress Lakes, Florida, a former census-designated place
 Cypress Lakes High School, Texas

See also
 Blue Cypress Lake, a lake in Florida